Paraf-e Bala (also Romanized as Pārāf-e Bālā; also known as Fāryāb (Persian: فارياب) and Pārāf) is a village in Byaban Rural District, Byaban District, Minab County, Hormozgan Province, Iran. As per the 2006 census, its population is 26, in 4 families.

References 

Populated places in Minab County